Izquierda Comunera (UPC) is a leftist nationalist political party active in the Spanish Community of Madrid. It defended the national recognition of Castile and its independence. The party is also defined as socialist, antifascist, feminist and republican.

History
IzCa was founded in Madrid in 2001 by ex-members of Tierra Comunera. In 2002, IzCo joined Unidad Popular Castellana, Partido Comunista del Pueblo Castellano and Círculo Castellano de Toledo to form Castilian Left.

References

Socialist parties in Spain
Communist parties in Spain
Political parties in the Community of Madrid